A total lunar eclipse took place on Tuesday, November 18, 1975, the second of two total lunar eclipses in 1975. A shallow total eclipse saw the Moon in relative darkness for 40 minutes and 11.1 seconds. The Moon was 6.421% of its diameter into the Earth's umbral shadow, and should have been significantly darkened. The partial eclipse lasted for 3 hours, 29 minutes and 2.1 seconds in total. Occurring only 4.9 days after apogee (Apogee on Friday, November 14, 1975), the Moon's apparent diameter was 4% smaller than average.

Visibility

Related lunar eclipses

Eclipses in 1975 
 A partial solar eclipse on Sunday, 11 May 1975.
 A total lunar eclipse on Sunday, 25 May 1975.
 A partial solar eclipse on Monday, 3 November 1975.
 A total lunar eclipse on Tuesday, 18 November 1975.

Lunar year series

Tritos series 
 Preceded: Lunar eclipse of December 19, 1964

 Followed: Lunar eclipse of October 17, 1986

Tzolkinex 
 Preceded: Lunar eclipse of October 6, 1968

 Followed: Lunar eclipse of December 30, 1982

Half-Saros cycle
A lunar eclipse will be preceded and followed by solar eclipses by 9 years and 5.5 days (a half saros). This lunar eclipse is related to two total solar eclipses of Solar Saros 142.

See also 
List of lunar eclipses
List of 20th-century lunar eclipses

Notes

External links 
 

1975-11
1975 in science
November 1975 events